Kevin Schaeffer (born October 16, 1984) is an American former professional ice hockey player who last played for the Las Vegas Wranglers in the ECHL. He was selected by the Nashville Predators in the 6th round (193rd overall) of the 2004 NHL Entry Draft. Unsigned from the Predators from attending Boston University, Schaeffer played 100 games in the American Hockey League with the Providence Bruins, Binghamton Senators, Lake Erie Monsters and the Hartford Wolf Pack before deciding to retire and pursue other opportunities at the end of the 2010–11 season.

Career statistics

Awards and honors

References

External links

1984 births
American men's ice hockey defensemen
Binghamton Senators players
Boston University Terriers men's ice hockey players
Charlotte Checkers (1993–2010) players
Hartford Wolf Pack players
Lake Erie Monsters players
Las Vegas Wranglers players
Living people
Nashville Predators draft picks
Providence Bruins players
Reading Royals players
Ice hockey players from New York (state)